The All-Ireland Senior Hurling Championship of 1994 was the 108th staging of Ireland's premier hurling knock-out competition. Offaly won the championship, beating Limerick 3-16 to 2-13 in a sensational final at Croke Park, Dublin.

Pre-championship
Prior to the opening of the championship Kilkenny were installed as the favourites to retain the All-Ireland title for a third consecutive year.  The last time they achieved this was in 1913, however, no final took place that year and Kilkenny were awarded the title as Limerick refused to play.  Since then they failed to capture the 'three-in-a-row', in spite of having the opportunity in 1933, 1976 and 1984. National League champions Tipperary and runners-up Galway were regarded as the two teams that would provide the strongest challenges to Kilkenny's supremacy.  Cork at 4/1, regarded as a team in decline, and Wexford at 6/1 formed the next grouping of teams who hoped to claim the All-Ireland crown.  Offaly, a team who claimed three Leinster titles in succession in the late 1980s but failed to reach the All-Ireland final, were regarded as outsiders at 16/1.  Antrim, Down, Limerick  and Dublin were rank outsiders at 25/1 each.

The Championship

Participating counties

Format

Munster Championship

Quarter-final: (2 matches) These are two lone matches between the first four teams drawn from the province of Munster.  Two teams are eliminated at this stage, while two teams advance to the next round.

Semi-finals: (2 matches) The winners of the two quarter-finals join the other two Munster teams to make up the semi-final pairings.  Two teams are eliminated at this stage, while two teams advance to the next round.

Final: (1 match) The winners of the two semi-finals contest this game.  One team is eliminated at this stage, while the winners advance to the All-Ireland semi-final.

Leinster Championship
First Round: (2 matches) These are two lone matches between two 'weaker' teams drawn from the province of Leinster.  Two teams are eliminated at this stage, while two teams advance to the next round.

Second Round: (1 match) The winners of the first round play each other in a lone second-round game.  One team is eliminated at this stage, while the winners advance to the Leinster quarter-final.

Quarter-finals: (2 matches) The winner of the second-round game joins three other Leinster teams to make up the two quarter-final pairings.  Two teams are eliminated at this stage, while two teams advance to the Leinster semi-finals.

Semi-finals: (2 matches) The winners of the two quarter-finals join two other Leinster teams to make up the semi-final pairings.  Two teams are eliminated at this stage, while two teams advance to the Leinster final.

Final: (1 match) The winners of the two semi-finals contest this game.  One team is eliminated at this stage, while the winners advance to the All-Ireland semi-final.

Ulster Championship
Final: (1 match) This is a lone match between the two competing Ulster teams.  One team is eliminated at this stage, while the winners advance to the All-Ireland semi-final.

All-Ireland Championship
Quarter-final: (1 match) This is a lone match between Galway and the All-Ireland 'B' champions.  One team is eliminated at this stage, while the winners advance to the All-Ireland semi-final where they play the Leinster champions.

Semi-finals: (2 matches) The Munster and Leinster champions will play the winners of the lone quarter-final and the Ulster champions.  The Munster and Leinster winners will be in opposite semi-finals.  Two teams are eliminated at this stage, while the two winnerss advance to the All-Ireland final.

Final: (1 match) The two semi-final winners will contest the All-Ireland final.

Leinster Senior Hurling Championship

Munster Senior Hurling Championship

Ulster Senior Hurling Championship

All-Ireland Senior Hurling Championship

Statistics

Scoring
Widest winning margin: 18 points
Wexford 4-24 (36) : (18) 4-6 Laois (Leinster semi-final)
Limerick 2-23 (29) : (11) 0-11 (11) Antrim (All-Ireland semi-final)
Most goals in a match: 8
Wexford 4-24 : 4-6 Laois (Leinster semi-final)
Limerick 4-14: 4-11 Cork (Munster quarter-final)
Most points in a match: 35
Limerick 0-25 : 2-10 Clare (Munster final)
Most goals by one team in a match: 4
Wexford 4-24 : 4-6 Laois (Leinster semi-final)
Limerick 4-14: 4-11 Cork (Munster quarter-final)
Most goals scored by a losing team: 4
Laois 4-6 : 4-24 Wexford (Leinster semi-final)
Cork 4-11 : 4-14 Limerick (Munster quarter-final)
Most points scored by a winning team: 25
Limerick 0-25 : 2-10 Clare (Munster final)
Most points scored by a losing team: 14
Wexford 0-14 : 1-18 Offaly (Leinster final)

Top scorers

Overall

Single game

References
 Corry, Eoghan, The GAA Book of Lists (Hodder Headline Ireland, 2005).
 Donegan, Des, The Complete Handbook of Gaelic Games (DBA Publications Limited, 2005).
 Fullam, Brendan, Captains of the Ash (Wolfhound Press, 2002).

External links
All-Ireland Senior Hurling Championship 1994 Results

See also

1994
1